Triplophysa wulongensis is a species of ray-finned fish in the genus Triplophysa endemic to Chongqing, China.

Footnotes 

wulongensis
Freshwater fish of China
Fish described in 2021